Estonian Red Cross is the Estonian national Red Cross Society.

The organization is established on 24 February 1919 in the initiative of Hans Leesment.

Since 1992 the organization is a member of International Federation of Red Cross and Red Crescent Societies.

References

External links
 

Estonia
Medical and health organizations based in Estonia
Organizations established in 1919